Való Világ 9, also known as Való Világ 9 powered by Big Brother, is the ninth season of the Hungarian reality television series Való Világ aired by RTL II. It is the second season based on the Big Brother license.

The show started on 4 November 2018. Anikó Nádai and Peti Puskás as the main hosts. Éva Baukó, who finished third in the Való Világ 4 and Győző Gáspár co-host the spin-off show BeleValóVilág. The show is scheduled for four months and was end in February 2019.

The daily show broadcast on RTL II at 22:00 from Monday to Saturday, 20:00 on Sunday. Followed by the spin-off show BeleValóVilág.

Compared to the previous seasons, it would be an innovation that the contestants able to communicate with the outside world for the first time in the Való Világ history, and they would appear on RTL Klub web site several times.

Villa residents

Selections table 

: Csoki did not participate in several tasks this week, it was against rules. He was not allowed to vote during the selection.
: Csoki was ejected from the show for dropped a sharp object to Zsuzsu without any prior warning and threatening.
: Roli used his superpower to took away Zsuzsu's right to vote during the selection.

Villa master

Superpower 
As in season 7, superpowers return to get villa residents a boost.

Sympathy vote 
Like previous seasons, the viewers could vote, which is the most likeable villa resident. In this season, according to the votes of the viewers, the villa resident with the lowest number of votes are in the Danger Zone, from which the Villa Master decides who to leave the villa. The two villa residents with fewest votes were Adri and Cintike. Roli, as the Villa Master, chose Cintike to leave the villa, and Adri was under protection for the upcoming selection and challenge. After Cintike left, two new villa residents moved in, Vivien and Lacika, who also under protection during the upcoming selection and challenge.

Weekly themes 
Civilization Week

This week, the villa residents lived on different historical ages. All 3 teams started in prehistoric times, during the tasks they could move up to the Middle Ages, then the winning team could go to modern times. The winner's prize was to read a compilation of the audience's comments.

 - Winning tribe 

School Week

This week, the villa residents had to study poetry, music, Hungarian literature and grammar, geography and mathematics in accordance with high school education and had to participate in physical education and ethics classes.

The villa residents were classified into a normal or catch-up group based on their performance at the beginning of the week and in the mid-week. Roli became the best student of the week, and the most developed students became Csoki and Hunor. Their prize was night outside the villa.

 - Winners of the week 

Social Media Days

This week, the villa residents had to fulfil various tasks, which had to be recorded with a camera. Viewers could express their opinions with "like" and "dislike" on social media. Viewers could vote for who performed best during the week. At the end of each day, the audience decided the winner was Csoki. His prize is host BeleValóVilág with Éva Baukó. But later, Csoki was removed from the show. Instead, Zsuzsu, the second place of the week took his prize.

Fitness Week

 - Winning couples 

Hierarchy Week 

This week, the villa residents had to behave like they were living in a kingdom. They had to make rules, and they had to complete all the king's or queen's orders. Because "I am the King" is Lacika's superpower, he became the King. The king could chose a chancellor to set up a hierarchy. Every villa residents had to execute the orders of his co-worker. The villa residents were obliged to comply with the rules set in the "Villabulla" during the thematic week. The king was also able to impose penalties on his companions.

Villér week

 - The winner of the week

NNB Box Week

Like the thematic week in the 5th season, this week, the villa residents clashed with the stars of the Budapest series in a boxing match. The villa residents were all-weekly trained for coaching at the end of the week.

 - The villa resident has defeated his opponent

Series week

This week, the villa resident had to shoot a five-part series. The director was different every day.

References

External links 
 Official site

2018 Hungarian television seasons
2019 Hungarian television seasons